Jack P. Ruina (August 19, 1923 – February 4, 2015) was a professor of electrical engineering at the Massachusetts Institute of Technology (MIT) from 1963 until 1997 and thereafter an MIT professor emeritus.  From 1966 to 1970, he was also vice president for special laboratories at MIT.

Ruina received his PhD degree in electrical engineering from the New York University Tandon School of Engineering (then Polytechnic Institute of Brooklyn),  He then served in positions at the U.S. Department of Defense, including deputy for research to the assistant secretary of research and engineering of the U.S. Air Force, Assistant Director of Defense Research and Engineering for the Office of the Secretary of Defense, and Director of the Advanced Research Projects Agency. In 1962, he was honored with the Fleming Award for being one of ten outstanding young men in government. From 1964 to 1966, during a two-year leave of absence from MIT, he served as president of the Institute for Defense Analysis in Arlington, Virginia.

While at MIT, Ruina served on government committees, including a presidential appointment to the General Advisory Committee from 1969 to 1977, and acting as senior consultant to the White House Office of Science and Technology Policy from 1977 to 1980.  He was an honorary member of the Board of Trustees of the MITRE Corporation, and the editor with Jeffrey Porro and Carl Kaysen of the book The Nuclear Age Reader (1988).

References

External links
Bio at MITRE
Bio at MIT Security Studies Program
Oral history interview with Jack P. Ruina, Charles Babbage Institute, University of Minnesota. Ruina discusses the beginning of the Information Processing Techniques Office within ARPA: the initial goals, how the idea of an information processing program was initiated, the selection of the first director, J.C.R. Licklider.  From 1961 to 1963 Ruina was the third Director of ARPA.
Oral history interview with J. C. R. Licklider, Charles Babbage Institute, University of Minnesota. Licklider, the first director of the Advanced Research Projects Agency's (ARPA) Information Processing Techniques Office (IPTO), discusses his work at Lincoln Laboratory and IPTO.  Topics include the work of ARPA director Jack Ruina.

1923 births
American engineers
Brown University faculty
DARPA directors
2015 deaths
MIT School of Engineering faculty
Mitre Corporation people
Polytechnic Institute of New York University alumni
United States Department of Defense officials
University of Illinois faculty